The 11th European Film Awards were presented on 4 December 1998 in London, England.

Awards

Best Film

References

External links
Winners
Nominees

1998 film awards
European Film Awards ceremonies
1998 in London
1998 in Europe
1998 in British cinema